Premium Picture Productions is a former movie studio located in Beaverton, Oregon, which was active in the early 1920s. It was founded in 1921, with J.J. Fleming as president and Dr. G.E. Watts and three others as directors of the corporation, and it opened its production lot in 1922.  The company went out of business in late 1925. The studio produced approximately fifteen silent films, including the following:
 The Flash (1922)
 Crashing Courage (1923)
 Flames of Passion (1923)
 The Frame-Up (1923)
 The Power Divine (1923)
 The Range Patrol (1923)
 Scars of Hate (1923)
 The Vow of Vengeance (1923)
 The Way of the Transgressor (1923)
 Beaten (1924)
 Harbor Patrol (1924)
 Shackles of Fear (1924)
 The Fighting Parson (or The Fighting Romeo) (1925), starring Al Ferguson

Many of their films were directed by Harry Moody (also credited as H.G. Moody) and William James Craft.

References

External links and references 
 List of the studio's movies from the American Film Institute
 Premium Picture Productions at IMDB
  made in Oregon

Mass media companies established in 1921
Mass media companies disestablished in 1925
Defunct American film studios
Beaverton, Oregon
Defunct companies based in Oregon
Mass media in Oregon
1921 establishments in Oregon
1925 disestablishments in Oregon
Film production companies of the United States